Rab Russell (born 31 December 1953) is a retired Scottish semi-professional football central defender who made over 200 appearances in the Scottish League for Cowdenbeath.

Personal life 
Russell attended Beath High School.

Honours 

Cowdenbeath Hall of Fame

References 

Scottish footballers
Cowdenbeath F.C. players
Scottish Football League players
1953 births
Living people
People from Cowdenbeath
Association football central defenders
Lochgelly Albert F.C. players
People educated at Beath High School